Employer Registration is the process by which a person or legal entity registers their intent to employ someone.

Types of employers
Employers can fall into one of two categories, people or groups who run a business and people who employ household workers.

People or legal entities who employ workers can include:
Sole proprietors  
Partnerships
Corporations, associations and trusts 
Nonprofit and charitable estates 
Organizations and joint ventures 
Limited liability companies.

People who employ household workers can include:
Private households  
Local chapters of college  
Local college clubs
Fraternities or sororities.

Registration in various countries

In the United Kingdom all employers, including self-employed persons, must register with HM Revenue and Customs.
In New Zealand, registration is made to the Inland Revenue.
In the United States, employers apply to the Internal Revenue Service to receive an Employer Identification Number.

References

Employers